Mikko Vilmunen (born 23 August 1980) is a Finnish football goalkeeper who plays for PS Kemi in Finland. Vilmunen was instrumental in the Drogheda United's 2007 Setanta Cup win, saving two penalties in the shoot out against Linfield.

Mikko joined Drogheda United in November 2006 from FC Haka where he was first choice keeper.

In January 2017, Vilmunen extended his contract with Palloseura Kemi Kings for an additional season.

Honours 

 Finnish Championship: 1
 FC Haka – 2004
 Finnish Cup: 1
 FC Haka – 2005
 Setanta Cup: 1
 Drogheda United – 2007
 F.A.I. League of Ireland:
 Drogheda United-2007

References

External links 
 https://www.rops.fi/edustusjoukkueen-uutiset/2746-rangaistusalueen-viikinkipaeaellikkoe
 https://www.independent.ie/regionals/droghedaindependent/sport/soccer/keegan-and-sami-sign-extensions-27101283.html
 https://web.archive.org/web/20190623000911/https://www.independent.ie/sport/soccer/vilmunen-ready-to-battle-for-place-26426059.html
 https://web.archive.org/web/20190623000925/https://www.mtvuutiset.fi/artikkeli/vilmunen-innolla-irlannin-kentille/4032196
 Veikkausliiga
 Player Profile form Official Drogheda United Website

1980 births
Living people
Finnish footballers
FC Haka players
Drogheda United F.C. players
League of Ireland players
Kuopion Palloseura players
Veikkausliiga players
Finnish expatriate footballers
Expatriate association footballers in the Republic of Ireland
Expatriate footballers in Norway
Association football goalkeepers
People from Lempäälä
Sportspeople from Pirkanmaa